Joseph A. Riley (December 14, 1923 – October 25, 1976) was an ice hockey player. He was born in Medford, Massachusetts. Riley helped lead Dartmouth College to two Frozen Fours during his career.  He was inducted into the United States Hockey Hall of Fame in 2002.  His brothers John and Bill are also in the USHOF.

Awards and honors

References

External links
 United States Hockey Hall of Fame bio

1923 births
1976 deaths
American men's ice hockey forwards
Dartmouth Big Green men's ice hockey players
Ice hockey players from Massachusetts
Sportspeople from Medford, Massachusetts
United States Hockey Hall of Fame inductees
AHCA Division I men's ice hockey All-Americans